Magomed Nurutdinov/Mahamed Nurudzinau (born February 5, 1982) is a Belarusian amateur boxer who boxed at the Olympics 2008 at welterweight and later became European champion.

At the 2005 World Championships he beat Konstantin Buga, Adam Trupish and Neil Perkins but lost the final to Cuban Erislandi Lara.

At the 2006 European Championships he was edged out by little-known Zoran Mitrovic, at the 2007 World Championships he won two bouts then was outclassed 6:26 by local hero and eventual winner Demetrius Andrade.

At the Olympics he was upset by John Jackson 2:4.

He won the bronze medal at the 2010 European Amateur Boxing Championships at Moscow, Russia after losing in the Semifinals against Alexis Vastine from France.

References

External links
World 2005
Qualifier
Euro 2008

Welterweight boxers
Living people
Boxers at the 2008 Summer Olympics
Olympic boxers of Belarus
1982 births
Belarusian people of Dagestani descent
Belarusian male boxers
AIBA World Boxing Championships medalists
European Games competitors for Belarus
Boxers at the 2015 European Games
21st-century Belarusian people